Wiryono Sastrohandoyo (born 31 May 1934) is a former Indonesian diplomat. He was ambassador to Austria, France and Australia.

Born in Yogyakarta, Special Region of Yogyakarta on 31 May 1934, Wiryono graduated from Yogyakarta Faculty in 1959.

Joining the Ministry of Foreign Affairs in 1962, his career saw him in diplomatic roles in Argentina, the United States, Austria, France and Australia. He was Indonesia's Permanent Representative
to the UN in Vienna from 1988 to 1989 and Ambassador to France from 1993 to 1996.

Appointed ambassador to Australia in December 1995, Wiryono was tasked with the job of rebuilding the bilateral relationship. Indonesia had withdrawn the appointment of its previous ambassador in July 1995 after pressure from the Australian Government. Relations between the two countries were somewhat strained, recent protests in Australia had involved burning the flag of Indonesia. The Australian Government was also conducting an inquiry into the 1975 death of six journalists during the Indonesian invasion of East Timor—20 years after the fact.

References

1934 births
Indonesian diplomats
Ambassadors of Indonesia to Australia
Ambassadors of Indonesia to Austria
Ambassadors of Indonesia to France
People from Yogyakarta
Living people